Theodor Kallifatides (born 1938) is a writer. He is a Greek immigrant to Sweden, and writes in Swedish.

Biography 
Kallifatides was born in the village of Molaoi, in Laconia, Greece, in 1938. His father was Dimitrios Kallifatides, a teacher originating from the Pontus, and his mother was Antonia Kyriazakou, from Molaoi. In 1946 he and his family moved to Athens, where he finished high school and studied in Karolos Koun's theatrical school. He emigrated to Sweden in 1964 and has lived in the country ever since. He studied philosophy, and lectured at Stockholm University between 1969 and 1972; later he was chief of Bonniers literary magazine between 1972 and 1976.

Kallifatides made his literary debut in 1969 with a poetry book, but gained recognition mainly through his subsequently published novels. He has published novels, poetry collections, travel essays and plays. He has written film scripts and has directed a film.

Kallifatides has received numerous awards for his works, which usually revolve around his experience of Greece and of being Greek in foreign domains, and almost all his works have been translated; some have been published in more than twenty languages.

Works in English 
 Peasants and Masters, 1990. (Swedish: Bönder och herrar, 1973, translated by Thomas Teal). 
 With the Coolness of Her Lips. (Swedish: Med sina läppars svalka, 2014.)
 Another Life: On Memory, Language, Love, and the Passage of Time., 2018. Other Press (Swedish: Ännu ett liv, 2017, translated by Marlaine Delargy). 304 pp. 
 The Siege of Troy. A Novel, 2019. Other Press (Swedish: Slaget om Troja, 2018, translated by Marlaine Delargy). 304 pp.

References

External links
 
Presentation of Kallifatides by The Immigrant Institute 

1938 births
Living people
Greek male writers
Greek emigrants to Sweden
Sommar (radio program) hosts
Swedish male writers
Articles containing video clips
Academic staff of Stockholm University
People from Molaoi